Pühertoonia is the third album by Estonian rock group Terminaator, released in 1997.

Track listing 

 Muinasjutu mets [Fairy tale forest] - 3:40
 Õnnelik 37 [Happy 37] - 3:54
 Šaakali päev [The day of the jackal] - 3:20
 Keegi tahab sind [Somebody wants you] - 4:15
 Sügav uni [Deep sleep] - 5:13
 Pime viha [Blind rage] - 3:39
 Valge liblika... [White butterfly's...] - 4:25
 Kui kuningas nutab [When the king cries] - 3:48
 Kristallkülmas öös [In a crystal cold night] - 4:57
 Imelikud soovid [Weird wishes] - 2:28
 Kes uskus? [Who believed?] - 3:46
 Tahan ärgata üles [I wanna wake up] - 3:08
 Ingli puudutus [Touch of an angel] - 8:25

Song information 

 "Muinajutu mets" is basically about how time separates close friends. The only song from "Pühertoonia" to be featured on "Go Live 2005".
 "Õnnelik 37" is about a man, who has everything. But that man doesn't feel free and he wants to really cut himself loose.
 "Šaakali päev" is about a man having a bad hair day and being very angry.
 "Keegi tahab sind" is about cheating in marriage. The "other" wonders, why she cheats on his husband, because he's a very good man and husband.
 "Sügav uni" is about a relationship gone bad. The woman is dreaming about good old days.
 "Pime viha" is about a man, to whom somebody does great injustice, making him feel bad, thus generating "blind rage" towards him/her.
 The message of "Valge liblika..." is: "I'm hurt because of you and I'm trying to forget you".
 "Kui kuningas nutab" is about the hard life of a king. He's so sad, that he rather wants to be a beggar.
 "Kristallkülmas öös" is a typical love song and also references to miracles. It's also on "Kuld".
 "Imelikud soovid" is about a girl, that wants the narrator so badly, that she doesn't care, what he does to her.
 "Kes uskus?" is about wanting or believing something and getting the opposite or getting nothing at all. Also on "Kuld".
 "Tahan ärgata üles" is about nightmares. The message may be deeper.
 "Ingli puudutus" is the longest song by Terminaator. It's about a man, whose beloved is dead. He feels, that her spirit is still with him and aids him throughout life. Also on "Kuld".

External links 
 Estmusic.com Listen to the songs

1997 albums
Terminaator albums
Estonian-language albums